Universidad de San Carlos may refer to:

Universidade Federal de São Carlos, in São Carlos, Brazil
University of San Carlos of Guatemala, based in Guatemala City
Universad de San Carlos (Guatemalan football club), based in Guatemala City and commonly known as USAC
Universidad San Carlos (Paraguay), based in Asunción, Paraguay.
University of San Carlos, in Cebu, Philippines